Metaphryniscus is a monotypic genus of toads in the family Bufonidae. The sole species is Metaphryniscus sosae. The species, and thereby the whole genus, is endemic to Venezuela and only known from its type locality, Cerro Marahuaca.
Its natural habitat is subtropical or tropical moist montane forests.

References

Bufonidae
Monotypic amphibian genera
Frogs of South America
Endemic fauna of Venezuela
Amphibians of Venezuela
Guayana Highlands
Vulnerable animals
Vulnerable biota of South America
Amphibians described in 1994
Taxa named by José Ayarzagüena
Taxa named by Stefan Jan Filip Gorzula
Taxa named by Josefa Celsa Señaris
Taxonomy articles created by Polbot